The Tenebrae choir is a London-based professional vocal ensemble founded and directed by former King's Singer Nigel Short. Co-founded by Short and Barbara Pollock in 2001, its repertoire covers works from the 16th to the 21st centuries.

The choir was launched in 2001 with a performance of Nigel Short's own composition, The Dream of Herod, created to demonstrate a more "theatrical" style of performing within religious buildings, involving movement around the performance venue as well as dramatic use of lighting and ambiance. In 2002, they commissioned John Tavener to compose Mother and Child, setting a poem by Brian Keeble for choir, organ and temple gong. They performed the world premiere and made a recording of the same title.

In 2006 it toured Joby Talbot's Path of Miracles to the churches in Spain on the Camino route, and formed an association with the London Symphony Orchestra, making recordings for LSO Live with the conductor Colin Davis. The choir's albums include Allegri: Miserere, which includes choral works ranging from Gregorio Allegri's Miserere to works by Benjamin Britten and John Tavener, released on the Signum Classics label.

When Tenebrae toured New York in 2011, The New York Times wrote: "if the group toured here as often as The Tallis Scholars, it could probably match — perhaps even draw on — that ensemble’s considerable following in New York."

They have also ventured into more popular genres, performing "So Long, and Thanks for all the Fish" in the film version of The Hitchhiker's Guide to the Galaxy. Tenebrae can also be heard on the soundtrack of the film Children of Men.

Selected discography
 Mother and Child

Notes

External links
 
 Signum Records website
 IMDB cast list for The Hitchhiker's Guide

British choirs
Musical groups established in 2001
2001 establishments in England